J. F. Roberts Octagonal Barn, also known as the Clark Octagonal Barn, is a historic octagon barn located near Rea, Andrew County, Missouri, United States. It was built about 1900, and is a two-story, octagonal wood-frame structure constructed of interior post and beam framing.  The central section is topped by an eight-sided hipped roof.

It was listed on the National Register of Historic Places in 1999.

References

Octagon barns in the United States
Barns on the National Register of Historic Places in Missouri
Buildings and structures completed in 1900
Buildings and structures in Andrew County, Missouri
National Register of Historic Places in Andrew County, Missouri